Mr. and Mrs. Sadachari is a 2016 Indian Marathi language action romance film, directed by Ashish Wagh and produced by  Utpal Acharya and Ashish Wagh under the banner Indian Films Studio. The film released on 19 February 2016 across Maharashtra. It stars Vaibbhav Tatwawdi and Prarthana Behere in lead roles. The hit pair is brought together again after Coffee Ani Barach Kahi. The movie is an official remake of the Kannada Blockbuster film Mr. and Mrs. Ramachari.

Cast
Vaibbhav Tatwawdi as Shiva Sadachari
Prarthana Behere as Gargi
Mohan Joshi as Shiva's Father
Vijay Andalkar 
Uma Sardeshmukh as Gargi's Mother
Uday Nene as Gargi's Father
Sumukhi Pendse
Prasad Jawade as Dattu
Shalva Kinjawdekar as Young Shiva

Plot
The Sadachari family is a middle-class Maharashtrian family, with a mother, father, and two sons. Jiva is the tame, docile one, who is a straight-A student, while Shiva (Vaibbhav Tatwawdi) is a hot-headed, street-smart altruistic boy, who idolizes Shivaji Maharaj. Shiva's father (Mohan Joshi) has given up on him, and the father-son have a strained relationship. Shiva avoids his father, college, and responsibilities, among other things. Shiva falls in love with Gargi (Prarthana Behere), who happens to be his best friend Dattu's sister. Dattu doesn't agree with this at first, but being a side-character, he doesn't have much of a choice but to give in. After a few saccharine-sweet romantic days, Gargi and Shiva have a huge fight, in which Gargi (sort of) walks out on Shiva. In fits of rage, they both agree to marry different people, who are brought into their lives by their respective parents. A few twists and turns later. Are they able to reconcile their differences and come back together? forms the crux of story.

Soundtrack

References

External links
 

2010s Marathi-language films
2016 films
Indian romantic drama films
Marathi remakes of Kannada films
2016 romantic drama films